Godobjiran District is a district in the northern Nugal region of Somalia. Its capital lies at Godobjiraan.

References

Districts of Somalia
Nugal, Somalia